Elizabeth Douglas may refer to:

 Elizabeth Douglas, Countess of Erroll (fl. 1590–1631), Scottish aristocrat and poet
 Elizabeth Douglas-Hamilton, Duchess of Hamilton (1916–2008), British noble
 Elizabeth Douglas-Home (1909–1990), spouse of the Prime Minister of the United Kingdom from 1963 to 1964
 Elizabeth Douglas Van Buren (1881–1961), British archaeologist
 Elizabeth Varley (1909–2002), born Elizabeth Susan Douglas-Scott-Montagu, English actress and writer